María Amaya Martínez Grisaleña is a Spanish journalist and politician who has been a member of the Basque Parliament for the Vox  party since 2020.

Martínez Grisaleña studied journalism at the Universidad del País Vasco before running a company selling non-lethal weaponry with her husband. Although she is a native Basque speaker, she has spoken out against what she claims as linguistic discrimination in the Basque Country against the Spanish language.

She was elected to the Basque Parliament during the 2020 Basque regional election for Vox and is currently the only Vox representative in the Basque Parliament.

References

1968 births
Living people
Basque politicians
Vox (political party) politicians
Spanish women in politics
Members of the 12th Basque Parliament
21st-century Spanish journalists
University of the Basque Country alumni
People from Vitoria-Gasteiz
Women members of the Basque Parliament